The Michael C. Carlos Museum is an art museum located in Atlanta on the historic quadrangle of Emory University's main campus. The Carlos Museum has the largest ancient art collections in the Southeast, including objects from ancient Egypt, Greece, Rome, the Near East, Africa and the ancient Americas. The collections are housed in a Michael Graves designed building which is open to the public.

History

One of the oldest museums in Georgia, the museum's collections date back to 1876, when a general museum known as Emory College Museum was established on Emory University's original campus in Oxford, Georgia. After the university was relocated to Atlanta, a small group of professors officially founded the Emory University Museum in 1919. The collections were housed and displayed in various buildings around the campus.

Over the years, Atlanta businessman Michael C. Carlos donated over $20 million to create a permanent home for the museum, which opened in 1985. The museum was renamed again to the Emory University Museum of Art and Archaeology and was officially accredited by the American Alliance of Museums as a museum of antiquities and fine arts. Carlos died in December 2002 at the age of 75.

A major expansion in 1993 transformed the museum into one of Atlanta's top arts institutions. Upon the new building's opening, the museum became known as the Michael C. Carlos Museum, named after its most generous patron.

In June 2022, it was announced that Henry Kim would be the new associate vice provost and director of the Museum beginning August 22, 2022.

Collection and activities
The museum's collections comprise more than 25,000 works, and the facility attracts 120,000 visitors annually. In addition to permanent and temporary exhibitions, the museum is a source of educational programming, providing lectures, symposia, workshops, performances, and festivals. The Carlos Museum also operates a teaching laboratory and conservation center, and publishes scholarly catalogues. The museum also brings art, history, and archaeology to the classroom of Georgia children through its outreach program, Art Odyssey. The Carlos Museum also runs Odyssey Online, a Web site for school-age children that explores the various cultures reflected in the museum's collections.

The museum's permanent Egyptian holdings were bolstered with the acquisition of 145 works from Canada's Niagara Falls Museum in 1999. The elaborately decorated ancient coffins and mummies of both humans and animals form the centerpiece of the permanent exhibition of ancient Egyptian art. Also in 1999, Carlos bequeathed a $10 million gift specifically for the purchase of ancient Greek and Roman pieces. As a result, the museum now owns and exhibits the finest existing portrait of the Roman emperor Tiberius and one of the country's best examples of Hellenistic sculpture, a depiction of Terpsichore, the Greek muse of dance. A total of 450 works of art are now on display in galleries devoted to Greek and Roman art.

In 1999, the Carlos Museum purchased an unidentified male mummy that some thought could be a New Kingdom pharaoh. Through research and collaboration with Emory University medical experts, museum scholars were able to identify the mummy as pharaoh Ramesses I.  The museum returned the mummy to Egypt in 2003 as a gift of goodwill and international cultural cooperation. His remains are permanently on display in a plexiglass case at the Luxor Museum.

On June 6, 2006 the museum purchased a headless statue Venus, for $968,000 at a Sotheby's auction in New York. A private collector in Houston, Texas, agreed to sell to whoever purchased the body, the head as well, which was last documented attached to the body in 1836. The head was sold for an additional $50,000.

References

External links
 Michael C. Carlos Museum

 

Carlos Museum, Michael C.
Institutions accredited by the American Alliance of Museums
Michael Graves buildings
Carlos Museum, Michael C.
Museums in DeKalb County, Georgia
Museums in Atlanta
Carlos Museum, Michael C.
Egyptological collections in the United States
Museums of ancient Rome in the United States
Museums of ancient Greece in the United States
Museums of Ancient Near East in the United States
Art museums established in 1876
1876 establishments in Georgia (U.S. state)
New Classical architecture
African art museums in the United States